The 2010–11 Tribute Cornwall/Devon League was the 24th full season of rugby union within the eighth tier of the English league system. Bideford the champions and the runners–up St Austell were promoted to the Tribute Western Counties West for 2011–12. Saltash, Stithians and Roseland were relegated to Tribute Cornwall One for the following season. For the first time the points scoring system with bonus points for tries, etc. was introduced.

Table

See also
 English rugby union system

References

External links
South West Rugby Union

Cornwall1
Tribute Cornwall/Devon